Myctophum indicum is a species of lanternfish.

References

External links

Myctophidae
Taxa named by Francis Day
Fish described in 1877